Thomas Anthony Younghans (born January 22, 1953) is an American former professional ice hockey player who played 429 games in the National Hockey League (NHL) for the Minnesota North Stars and New York Rangers between 1976 and 1982. Younghans featured in the 1981 Stanley Cup Finals.

He was a member of the University of Minnesota hockey team before turning professional, winning the national championship in 1976. Internationally Younghans played for the United States at the 1976, 1977 and 1978 World Championships as well as the 1981 Canada Cup tournament.

Career statistics

Regular season and playoffs

International

References

External links
 

1953 births
Living people
American men's ice hockey right wingers
Chicago Blackhawks scouts
Fort Worth Texans players
Ice hockey coaches from Minnesota
Ice hockey people from Saint Paul, Minnesota
Memphis South Stars players
Minnesota Golden Gophers men's ice hockey players
Minnesota North Stars players
NCAA men's ice hockey national champions
New York Rangers players
Saint Mary's University of Minnesota alumni
Springfield Indians players
Undrafted National Hockey League players